Slanted and Enchanted is the debut studio album by American indie rock band Pavement, released on April 20, 1992 by Matador Records. It is the only Pavement album to feature drummer Gary Young. 

The album received critical acclaim and is seen as a landmark for indie rock, with Rolling Stone ranking it 199th on its 2020 edition of The 500 Greatest Albums of All Time. As of 2007, the album had sold 150,000 copies. In 2022, Alex Ross Perry adapted the album into a rock opera titled Slanted! Enchanted!

Background 
Slanted and Enchanted was distributed to critics as early as 1991, months before its official release; the original distribution did not feature the entire band, as several members joined during its production. The recording sessions were split between South Makepeace Studios in Brooklyn, New York (recorded December 24, 1990) and Louder Than You Think Studios in Stockton, California (recorded January 13–20, 1991).

Release
The first single (EP), "Summer Babe" appeared in August 1991. It was the last release on Chicago's Drag City label before the band moved to Matador. It contained the B-sides "Mercy Snack (The Laundromat)" and "Baptist Blacktick"  that were later included on the deluxe version of the album. A different mix of "Summer Babe," entitled "Summer Babe (Winter Version)," became the first track on the band's debut album. The song was also ranked by Rolling Stone magazine as number 286 in its 2004 list of the 500 greatest songs of all time, and as number 292 in the 2011 update of the list.

"Trigger Cut" was first released in the UK by Big Cat Records on July 13, 1992, later released in the US by Matador the following month.

Packaging 
The title Slanted and Enchanted is taken from the title of a cartoon made by the late Silver Jews frontman David Berman. Its cover art was created by appropriating that of an existing album, Ferrante & Teicher's Keyboard Kapers. Slanted and Enchanted was officially released on 20 April 1992 to critical acclaim, originally reaching a peak of number 72 on the UK Albums Chart. As of 2007, the album had sold 150,000 copies.

In 2002, Matador released Slanted and Enchanted: Luxe & Reduxe, a compilation containing Slanted and Enchanted in its entirety, as well outtakes and other rarities from the same era.

Critical reception

Slanted and Enchanted received critical acclaim. In a contemporary review of the album, Robert Christgau of The Village Voice was highly positive, writing that Pavement are "always good at both tune and noise" and that the music on Slanted and Enchanted yields "a message complex enough to offer hope ... that the lyrics will catch up". Erik Davis of Spin designated Slanted and Enchanted as the magazine's "Platter du Jour" for March 1992, describing the album as "so fine it occasionally seems too perfect."

Legacy 
Since its release Slanted and Enchanted has appeared on many critics' best-of lists and is frequently cited as being among the most influential indie rock albums of the 1990s. AllMusic's Stephen Thomas Erlewine cited the album as "a left-field classic" and "one of the most influential records of the '90s". In 2002, Pitchfork awarded the album their maximum grade of 10.0/10.0 in a review of the album's reissue and ranked it as the fifth greatest album of the 1990s in 2003. Rolling Stone called Slanted and Enchanted "the quintessential indie rock album" and placed it on the magazine's list of the 500 greatest albums of all time In 2017, Billboard called it a "slacker masterpiece" and "the definitive indie rock album".

Accolades

Track listing

Personnel
Pavement
 Stephen Malkmus – lead vocals (tracks 1–9, 11–16), lead and rhythm guitar (tracks 1–16)
 Scott Kannberg – bass guitar (tracks 1–16), backing vocals (tracks 1–2, 4–5), lead and rhythm guitar (tracks 1–16), lead vocals (track 10)
 Gary Young – drums (tracks 1–16)
Additional Personnel
 Cy Jameson – engineer (track 9)

Charts
Album chart usages for UK2

References

External links

1992 debut albums
1992 albums
Domino Recording Company albums
Flying Nun Records albums
Matador Records albums
Pavement (band) albums
Lo-fi music albums
Noise pop albums